Minuscule 227 (in the Gregory-Aland numbering), ε 118 (Soden), is a Greek minuscule manuscript of the New Testament, on parchment. Paleographically it has been assigned to the 13th century. It has marginalia.

Description 

The codex contains a complete text of the four Gospels, on 158 parchment leaves (size ). The leaves are arranged in quarto (four leaves in quire). The text is written in one column per page, 27 lines per page. Some leaves were dislocated by binder.

The text is divided according to the Ammonian Sections, whose numbers are given at the margin, but references to the Eusebian Canons are absent.

Many corrections were made by a later hand, which dates 1308.
It contains portraits of the four Evangelists.

Text 

The Greek text of the codex is a representative of the Byzantine text-type. Hermann von Soden classified it to the K1. Aland placed it in Category V.

According to the Claremont Profile Method it represents textual family Kx in Luke 1 and Luke 20. In Luke 10 no profile was made. It belongs to the textual cluster Ω.

History 

A later hand, which dates from 1308, has been making corrections.

The manuscript belonged to Pedro Hurtado de Mendoza (1578–1651), along with minuscule 819.

It was described by Daniel Gotthilf Moldenhawer, who collated it about 1783 for Birch (Esc. 5). It was shortly described by Emmanuel Miller in 1848.

It is currently housed at the Escurial (Cod. Escurialensis, X. III. 15).

See also 

 List of New Testament minuscules
 Biblical manuscript
 Textual criticism

References

Further reading 

 Emmanuel Miller, Catalogue des manuscrits grecs de la bibliothèque de l'Escurial (Paris 1848), p. 399.
 

Greek New Testament minuscules
13th-century biblical manuscripts